The 2014–15 Slovenian Second League season began on 10 August 2014 and ended on 30 May 2015. Each team played a total of 27 matches.

Clubs

League table

Results

First and second round

Third round

See also
2014–15 Slovenian PrvaLiga
2014–15 Slovenian Third League

External links
Football Association of Slovenia 

Slovenian Second League seasons
2014–15 in Slovenian football
Slove